George Howe (1769 – 11 May 1821) was a poet, printer, and editor of the first Australian newspaper, the Sydney Gazette.

Early life 

Howe was the son of Thomas Howe, a government printer on Basseterre, Saint Christopher Island (now better known as Saint Kitts) in the West Indies. When he was 21, he went to London and worked as a printer for The Times. In March 1799, George Howe, alias George Happy, alias Happy George, was charged with shoplifting after he and a man named Thomas Jones had robbed a mercer’s shop at Alcester. and they were sentenced to death, commuted to transportation for life to New South Wales. Howe arrived at Sydney on 22 November 1800.
He received a full pardon on 4 June 1806.

Editor of the Sydney Gazette 

A small printing press had been brought to Australia by Governor Arthur Phillip, and a convict named George Hughes used it to print a considerable number of orders, rules and regulations. Soon after he arrived George Howe became the government printer, and in 1802 printed New South Wales General Standing Orders consisting of 146 pages, the first book to be printed in Australia. In May 1803 Governor King, in a dispatch to Lord Hobart, mentioned the establishment of the Sydney Gazette as a weekly publication—its first number had appeared on 5 March and asked that a new font of type should be sent to Sydney. The paper was carried on at the risk of Howe, who, though he had been fully emancipated in 1806, did not receive a salary as government printer until 1811 when he was granted only £60 a year. In the meantime Howe conducted the Gazette under difficulties, often running out of paper and suffering much from patrons who fell behind in their subscriptions. In 1810 a lightning strike almost destroyed Howes's printing office. Howe tried various expedients to keep his household going, at one time keeping a school and at another becoming a professional debt collector. Another of these expedients was becoming a professional mobile food stand for the public, he did this for 3 years.

In addition to the Gazette Howe began the publication of the New South Wales Pocket Almanac in 1806, which became a regular yearly publication from 1808 to 1821. He also began trading in sandalwood, and in 1813 found himself liable for over £90 of duty on two consignments. He appears to have become more prosperous, as in 1817 he was one of the original subscribers when the Bank of New South Wales was founded. Howe died on 11 May 1821 and left an estate of £400. He was married twice, and his second wife survived him with children of both marriages. He seems to have been a man of indomitable spirit and, considering his difficulties, was a good printer and editor. The memorial placed in the printing office by his son stated that "his charity knew no bounds". His amiable disposition saw him given the nickname “George Happy.”

Family 
Howe's eldest son, Robert (1795–1829), helped his father from age 9, but as a teenager rebelled, indulging in excessive alcohol consumption and fathering an illegitimate child before converting to Methodism under the guidance of Ralph Mansfield and returning to the family business in 1820. He printed the first magazine, The Australian Magazine; or, Compendium of Religious, Literary, and Miscellaneous Intelligence (1821), hymn-book, An Abridgment of the Wesleyan Hymns, selected from the larger Hymn-book published in England (1821), and Church of England hymn-book, Select Portions of the Psalms of David etc. (1828), in Australia. The first volume of verse published by a native-born Australian Wild Notes from the Lyre of a Native Minstrel by Charles Tompson junior, which appeared in 1826, is an excellent example of R. Howe's typographical work. Like many other editors in colonial Australia, Howe was implicated in several libel suits. Moreover, his editorial policies, stemming from his religious convictions and the newspaper's continuing support for the government, led to him being horsewhipped by William Redfern. Starting 1 January 1821, the Gazette was jointly edited by Mansfield, a division of duties that Howe hoped would facilitate his retirement from the newspaper. Less than a month later, on 29 January 1829, Howe drowned in a boating accident off Fort Denison, leaving his wife, Ann, as proprietor of the Gazette and Mansfield as the editor.

George Terry Howe (c. 1806–63), Robert's younger half-brother by his father's common law wife, Elizabeth Easton, went to Launceston, Tasmania in October 1821, becoming the town's first printer and the founding editor of the Tasmanian and Port Dalrymple Advertiser. In 1825, he was persuaded by the Lt. Governor Sir George Arthur to form a partnership with James Ross in Hobart, where he was appointed government printer and co-edited the Hobart Town Gazette. In 1827, he left the Gazette to edit the Tasmanian for six months before returning to Sydney. He died there on 6 April 1863. He was married and had six daughters and a son.

References

1769 births
1821 deaths
Australian poets
Convicts transported to Australia
Accidental deaths in New South Wales
Boating accident deaths
People from Basseterre
Australian newspaper editors